Dominic E. Bianchi (born February 22, 1979) is an American animation director and storyboard artist. Bianchi is known for directing multiple episodes of the animated series Family Guy, most notably the show's celebrated 150th episode, "Brian & Stewie".

Prior to Family Guy, Bianchi served as a production coordinator for the animated series ¡Mucha Lucha!, before the show's cancellation.

Career
Bianchi joined Family Guy in 2005, and has since directed and provided storyboards for multiple episodes, including:
"North by North Quahog"
"Fast Times at Buddy Cianci Jr. High"
"Barely Legal"
"Movin' Out (Brian's Song)"
"The Man with Two Brians"
"Three Kings"
"Big Man on Hippocampus"
"Brian & Stewie"
"And I'm Joyce Kinney"
"Screams of Silence: The Story of Brenda Q"
"Back to the Pilot"
"A Fistful of Meg"(co-wrote with Joe Vaux)

References

External links

American television directors
American animated film directors
Living people
American storyboard artists
1969 births